Claudine Monfette, nicknamed Mouffe, is a Quebec actress, screenwriter and lyricist born on 31 January 1947 at Montreal (Canada).

Biography 
A graduate of the National Theater School in 1966, Mouffe met Robert Charlebois and became his partner. She worked with him and wrote him several of his songs, among which "Deux femmes en or" and especially "Ordinaire", a title which became one of his greatest hits.

She then wrote for the singer Renée Claude in 1975. She signs "Rêver en couleur" and "Le mur du son" to music by Robert Charlebois and "Je suis une femme" to a composition by André Gagnon.

Later, she also signed some texts for Nicole Martin (Fais-moi confiance, title appeared on the album Laisse-moi partir in 1979, then Vivre ma vie in 1982 to music by Angelo Finaldi, A retro girl in 1984...).

Bibliography 
Mouffe, At the heart of showbiz, biography of Carmel Dumas with the help of Mouffe, Les Éditions La Presse, 280 pages, 2020.

Filmography

Actress 
 1967: You mustn't die for that: Madeleine
 1968: To the heart: Encyclopédine Monfette
 1970: Where are you?
 1974: Bulldozer: Solange Galarneau

Writer 
 1974: Bulldozer

Awards and nominations

Notes and references

External links 
 

Actresses from Quebec
Canadian songwriters
1945 births
Living people